Various radionuclides emit beta particles, high-speed electrons or positrons, through radioactive decay of their atomic nucleus. These can be used in a range of different industrial, scientific, and medical applications. This article lists some common beta-emitting radionuclides of technological importance, and their properties.

Fission products

Strontium 
Strontium-90 is a commonly used beta emitter used in industrial sources. It decays to yttrium-90, which is itself a beta emitter. It is also used as a thermal power source in radioisotope thermoelectric generator (RTG) power packs. These use heat produced by radioactive decay of strontium-90 to generate heat, which can be converted to electricity using a thermocouple. Strontium-90 has a shorter half-life, produces less power, and requires more shielding than plutonium-238, but is cheaper as it is a fission product and is present in a high concentration in nuclear waste and can be relatively easily chemically extracted. Strontium-90 based RTGs have been used to power remote lighthouses. As strontium is water-soluble, the perovskite form strontium titanate is usually employed as it is not water-soluble and has a high melting point.

Strontium-89 is a short-lived beta emitter which has been used as a treatment for bone tumors, this is used in palliative care in terminal cancer cases. Both strontium-89 and strontium-90 are fission products.

Neutron activation products

Tritium 

Tritium is a low-energy beta emitter commonly used as a radiotracer in research and in traser self-powered lightings. The half-life of tritium is 12.3 years. The electrons from beta emission from tritium are so low in energy (average decay energy 5.7 keV)  that a Geiger counter cannot be used to detect them. An advantage of the low energy of the decay is that it is easy to shield, since the low energy electrons penetrate only to shallow depths, reducing the safety issues in deal with the isotope.

Tritium can also be found in metal work in the form of a tritiated rust, this can be treated by heating the steel in a furnace to drive off the tritium-containing water.

Tritium can be made by the neutron irradiation of lithium.

Carbon 
Carbon-14 is also commonly used as a beta source in research, it is commonly used as a radiotracer in organic compounds. While the energy of the beta particles is higher than those of tritium they are still quite low in energy. For instance the walls of a glass bottle are able to absorb it. Carbon-14 is made by the np reaction of nitrogen-14 with neutrons. It is generated in the atmosphere by the action of cosmic rays on nitrogen. Also a large amount was generated by the neutrons from the air bursts during nuclear weapons testing conducted in the 20th century. The specific activity of atmospheric carbon increased as a result of the nuclear testing but due to the exchange of carbon between the air and other parts of the carbon cycle it has now returned to a very low value. For small amounts of carbon-14, one of the favoured disposal methods is to burn the waste in a medical incinerator, the idea is that by dispersing the radioactivity over a very wide area the threat to any one human is very small.

Phosphorus
Phosphorus-32 is a short-lived high energy beta emitter, which is used in research in radiotracers. It has a half-life of 14 days.  It can be used in DNA research. Phosphorus-32 can be made by the neutron irradiation (np reaction) of sulfur-32 or from phosphorus-31 by neutron capture.

Nickel
Nickel-63 is a radioisotope of nickel that can be used as an energy source in Radioisotope Piezoelectric Generators. It has a half-life of 100.1 years. It can be created by irradiating nickel-62 with neutrons in a nuclear reactor.

See also
Commonly used gamma-emitting isotopes
Betavoltaics

References

External links
List of Pure Beta Emitters, (U. Wisconsin Madison)

Nuclear physics
Nuclear chemistry
Radioactivity
Isotopes
Nuclear materials